Jenny Eidolf (born 1 August 1971) is a Swedish freestyle skier. She competed in the women's moguls event at the 1998 Winter Olympics.

References

External links
 

1971 births
Living people
Swedish female freestyle skiers
Olympic freestyle skiers of Sweden
Freestyle skiers at the 1998 Winter Olympics
Sportspeople from Uppsala